Playlist: The Very Best of Martina McBride is a compilation album from Martina McBride released as part of the Legacy Records Playlist series. The album features 14 tracks, 11 previously released and three not previously included on any of McBride's albums.

Track listing

References

Martina McBride albums
McBride, Martina
2008 compilation albums
RCA Records compilation albums